South Coast, an electoral district of the Legislative Assembly in the Australian state of New South Wales, was created in 1927.


Members for South Coast

Election results

Elections in the 2010s

2019

2015

2011

Elections in the 2000s

2007

2003

Elections in the 1990s

1999

1995

1991

Elections in the 1980s

1988

1984

1981

Elections in the 1970s

1978

1976

1973

1971

Elections in the 1960s

1968

1965

1962

Elections in the 1950s

1959

1956

1953

1950

Elections in the 1940s

1947

1944

1942 by-election

1941

Elections in the 1930s

1938

1935

1932

1930

Elections in the 1920s

1927

Notes

References

New South Wales state electoral results by district